Again: Interactive Crime Novel, known in Japan as , is an adventure video game developed by Cing and published by Tecmo for the Nintendo DS. It was released in Japan on December 10, 2009 and in North America on April 2, 2010. It was originally titled Again: Eye of Providence.

Plot
A string of serial murders from 19 years ago have started up again. The player takes the role of J, an agent of the FBI and sole survivor of the murders. J has a special ability called "past vision" to solve puzzles, which he uses as he investigates the murders committed by the serial killer known only as "Providence".

Gameplay
The game is presented in FMV cutscenes. While playing the game, the DS is held vertically, using two screens for the visions. Environments are explored in first person, with the player moving around using the control pad. The player can use J's psychic abilities to see into the past, which allows him to investigate crime scenes as they happened. The player can inspect items and interact with the environment using the touch screen, and can view visions of the past by manipulating the area to make it look like what it looked like when the crime was committed. After all of the visions in an area have been found, the player will be given a series of clips that are out of order. Putting the clips in order reveals a short video where the murder is shown. J has a "psychic health meter" which depletes if the players uses his abilities on areas irrelevant to the case. Completely draining the meter results in a game over, forcing the player to restart the investigation. J can also interview witnesses for additional information through a branching dialogue system.

Reception

The game received "mixed" reviews according to the review aggregation website Metacritic. Critics praised the concept, FMV artstyle, and controls, but criticized the "Psychic health meter", mechanics, sense of direction, dialogue system, and ending.

Writing for Eurogamer, John Walker gave a disappointed review, stating, "It's a game that asks the player to think more deeply, or at least demands that one be slightly pretentious when discussing it. But rather sadly, it's also rubbish.". Writing for Game Informer, Annette Gonzalez called the game a "Huge snoozefest" and criticized the area graphics, calling them "Muddy and pixelated". Writing for IGN, Arthur Gies was harsh on the game, calling it "Full of bad adventure game cliches" and "Mired in repetition". In a review for GameSpot, Nathan Meunier criticized the game's plot progression, calling it "Awkward and clunky", but praised the FMV artstyle, saying it "[Made] the [game] stand out in a good way". In Japan, Famitsu gave it a score of one eight, two sevens, and one eight, for a total of 30 out of 40. Randy Nelson from Nintendo Power praised the game mechanics that recreate past crimes for bringing "a fresh new twist" to the DS hardware but felt there wasn't enough of it. He concludes by calling Again "an open-and-shut case for budding crime-solvers with a taste for the unusual."

References

External links

 

2009 video games
Adventure games
Detective video games
Cing games
Nintendo DS games
Nintendo DS-only games
Tecmo games
Video games about police officers
Video games about psychic powers
Video games developed in Japan
Visual novels